Ivan Baraban (born 21 January 1988 in Vinkovci) is a Croatian professional footballer who plays as a forward who play for third-tier Mladost Ždralovi.

Career
He joined Mladost after a spell at NK Jarun Zagreb.

Honours

Player

Club
Široki Brijeg
Bosnian Cup: 2016–17

References

External links
 
Ivan Baraban at Sofascore

1988 births
Living people
Sportspeople from Vinkovci
Association football forwards
Croatian footballers
HNK Cibalia players
RNK Split players
NK Osijek players
NK Široki Brijeg players
FK Sloboda Tuzla players
Croatian Football League players
Premier League of Bosnia and Herzegovina players
First Football League (Croatia) players
Second Football League (Croatia) players
Croatian expatriate footballers
Expatriate footballers in Bosnia and Herzegovina
Croatian expatriate sportspeople in Bosnia and Herzegovina